Luis Felipe Gutiérrez Rivero (born 9 January 1988) is a visually impaired Paralympic athlete from Cuba. He competes in T13 sprint and F13 jumping events. He won a bronze medal in the 100 m T13 and finished fifth in the 200 m T13 event at the 2008 Summer Paralympics. At the next Paralympics he won a gold medal in the long jump F13 and a silver in the 100 m T13. He also won four gold and one silver medals at the Parapan American Games in 2011 and 2015.

Gutiérrez holds the long jump and triple jump world records for F13 classified athletes.

Notes

References

External links

 

1988 births
Living people
Cuban male sprinters
Cuban male long jumpers
Paralympic athletes of Cuba
Paralympic gold medalists for Cuba
Paralympic silver medalists for Cuba
Paralympic bronze medalists for Cuba
Athletes (track and field) at the 2008 Summer Paralympics
Athletes (track and field) at the 2012 Summer Paralympics
Visually impaired sprinters
Visually impaired long jumpers
Paralympic sprinters
Paralympic long jumpers
World record holders in Paralympic athletics
Medalists at the 2008 Summer Paralympics
Medalists at the 2012 Summer Paralympics
Paralympic medalists in athletics (track and field)
Medalists at the 2011 Parapan American Games
People from Pinar del Río